Abiku is a Yoruba word that can be translated as "predestined to death". It is from (abi) "that which was born" and (iku) "death".

Definition 
Abiku refers to the spirits of children who die before reaching puberty; a child who dies before twelve years of age being called an Abiku, and the spirit, or spirits, who caused the death being also called Abiku.

Not only is an abiku a spirit of a child who dies young, the belief is that the spirit returns to the same mother multiple times to be reborn multiple times. It is the belief that the spirit does not ever plan to "stay put in life" so it is "indifferent to the plight of its mother and her grief."

The spirits themselves are believed to live in trees, especially the iroko, baobab and silk-cotton species.

Literature 
"Ben Okri's novel The Famished Road is based upon an abiku. Debo Kotun's novel Abiku, a political satire of the Nigerian military oligarchy, is based upon an abiku. Gerald Brom's illustrated novel, The Plucker, depicts a child's toys fighting against an abiku," as described by Pulse. An Abiku Child's return also occurs in the writing of Slovenian Novelist Gabriela Babnik, in her novel Koža iz bombaža. We also see Wole Soyinka's poem 'Abiku' rely heavily on this occurrence. Ayọ̀bámi Adébáyọ̀'s novel Stay With Me has a couple whose children die at infancy.  And an abiku is the central character in Tobi Ogundiran's short story "The Many Lives of an Abiku".

In another sense, the Abiku phenomenon could have involved sickle cell carrying. This was based on the precolonial Yorubas' low understanding of science, symptoms and life span.

Research 
A review of the oral histories around abiku note that:

"Such accounts (sometimes they are just hasty definitions) often mix facts about àbíkú with facts about ògbánje; represent àbíkú as homogeneous across time and space; fail to distinguish between popular and expert, official and heretical, indigenous and exogenous discourses of àbíkú; assume that the belief in àbíkú has a psychological rather than ontological origin; and hastily appropriate àbíkú to serve as a symbol for present-day, metropolitan concepts and concerns."

See also
 Ogbanje

References
10. https://www.cdc.gov/ncbddd/sicklecell/features/scd-related-death-age.html

 
Jones, Gertrude. Dictionary of Mythology Folklore and Symbols. New York:Thevj Scarecrow Press, 1962.

External links 
Sacred Texts.com gives more explanations about Abikus - facsimile of a chapter from Yoruba-Speaking peoples of the slave coast of West Africa by A. B. Ellis, 1894

Yoruba culture
Yoruba mythology
Yoruba words and phrases
Reincarnation